Search and Rescue is an Australian observational documentary series that first aired on the Nine Network on 7 May 2008.

Search and Rescue follows the search and rescue operations of several different Victoria Police divisions, such as the Victoria Police Air-Wing and Victoria Police Diving Squad.

Nine Network original programming
2008 Australian television series debuts
2008 Australian television series endings
Australian factual television series